Carson Ross (born December 15, 1946) is the mayor of Blue Springs, Missouri. He is the first African American mayor of Blue Springs. He is a Republican.

References 

1946 births
Living people
People from Bradley County, Arkansas
People from Blue Springs, Missouri
African-American mayors in Missouri
African-American state legislators in Missouri
African-American United States Army personnel
Mayors of places in Missouri
Republican Party members of the Missouri House of Representatives
Rockhurst University alumni
United States Army soldiers
21st-century African-American people
20th-century African-American people